Camilo Cienfuegos (named after the Cuban revolutionary Camilo Cienfuegos) also known as  Callejón de Los Patos is a village and consejo popular ("popular council") in Santa Clara, Villa Clara, Cuba.

References 

Populated places in Villa Clara Province